Romanyata is a rural locality (a village) in Chaykovsky, Perm Krai, Russia. The population was 271 as of 2010.

Geography 
Romanyata is located 53 km east of Chaykovsky. Gorodishche is the nearest rural locality.

References 

Rural localities in Chaykovsky urban okrug